Doris Akol is a Ugandan lawyer and administrator. In December 2021, she was appointed as Technical Assistance Advisor at the International Monetary Fund, in Washington, DC, United States.

Before that, she was a Partner at the Dentons' Kampala office. She is also a former Commissioner General of the Uganda Revenue Authority (URA). She was appointed to that position by Maria Kiwanuka, the then Ugandan Minister of Finance, Planning and Economic Development, on Monday, 27 October 2014. She replaced Allen Kagina, who retired after two consecutive five-year terms at the helm of the URA.

Education
Doris Akol attended Nakasero Primary School. For her O-Level education, she studied at Mount Saint Mary's College Namagunga. She then attended Nabisunsa Girls Secondary School, for her A-Level studies. She holds the degree of Bachelor of Laws (LLB), obtained in 1993, from Makerere University, Uganda's oldest and largest public university. She also holds a postgraduate Diploma in Law Practice (Dip.Law.Pract.), obtained from the Law Development Centre, in Kampala. Her Diploma in Financial Management (Dip.Fin.Mngmt.), was obtained from the Uganda Management Institute. She holds the degree of Master of Laws (LLM), obtained from Makerere University. Her second degree of Master of Laws, was obtained from McGill University in Canada in 2001. She is a member of the Institute of Chartered Secretaries and Administrators (ICSA).

Work experience
Following her graduation from the Law Development Centre in 1994, she spent one year at PricewaterhouseCoopers, at their Kampala offices. In 1995, she joined URA, as a Legal Officer. From 2012 until 2014, Doris Akol was the Commissioner for Legal Services and Board Affairs at the Uganda Revenue Authority. In that capacity, she also served as the Company's Legal Secretary. In October 2014, she was appointed Commissioner general at URA. She assumed office on 30 October 2014. On 29 March 2020, Akol was relieved of her duties at URA and John Musinguzi Rujoki was named as her replacement.

Awards
In September 2018, Doris Akol received the African Women in Leadership Award, from the African Virtuous Women Awards Organisation, at a ceremony held at the Women Development Centre, Abuja, Nigeria's capital city, in recognition of her leadership qualities and achievements.

In March 2018, Akol received the 2018 Person of the Year Public Excellence Award, from African Leadership Magazine, in recognition of her leadership's contribution to growth and development.

See also
 Uganda Revenue Authority
 Economy of Uganda
 Ministry of Finance, Planning and Economic Development (Uganda)

References

External links
Website of the International Monetary Fund (IMF)

Living people
1970 births
Ugandan women lawyers
McGill University Faculty of Law alumni
Makerere University alumni
People from Northern Region, Uganda
People educated at Mount Saint Mary's College Namagunga
People educated at Nabisunsa Girls' Secondary School
20th-century Ugandan lawyers
21st-century Ugandan lawyers
Law Development Centre alumni
Ugandan expatriates in Canada
20th-century women lawyers
21st-century women lawyers
Ugandan chief executives
Ugandan Christians
Ugandan women chief executives